The dusky sleeper or brown spinecheek gudgeon (Eleotris fusca) is a species of fish in the family Eleotridae found in many Indo-West Pacific regions, from the coast of eastern Africa to Hawaii, where it can be found in lagoons, estuaries, and freshwater streams with muddy bottoms.

References

External links
 http://www.marinespecies.org/aphia.php?p=taxdetails&id=219356
 https://www.itis.gov/servlet/SingleRpt/SingleRpt?search_topic=TSN&search_value=553314
 http://en.bdfish.org/2011/10/dusky-sleeper-eleotris-fusca-forster-1801/
 

fusca
Freshwater fish of Sri Lanka
Fish described in 1801